The East German Republic Day Parade of 1984 was a parade on Karl-Marx-Allee in East Berlin on October 7, 1984 commemorating the 35th anniversary of the establishment of East Germany.  Soviet Foreign Minister Andrei Gromyko attended the celebrations.

Preparatory activities
Timeline for preparatory activities in East Berlin:

1 November 1983 – The beginning of the brainstorming process of parade plans.
25 August 1984 – The beginning of the official parade preparations.
1-15 September 1984 – The beginning of parade training at military barracks. The preparation of military technology for the parade.
20-25 September 1984 – Parade training on a motorway section near Berlin (Groß Köris).
26 September 1984 – Parade rehearsal of the ground column to at Schönefeld Airfield (now Berlin Brandenburg Airport).
29 September 1984 – Transfer of the mot. Troops to Berlin and preparation of military technology
2 October 1984 – Nighttime preliminary rehearsal.
4 October 1984 – Final general rehearsal.

See also 
East Germany
National People's Army
Public holidays in Germany

References 

1984 in East Germany
Military parades in East Germany
October 1984 events in Europe